Preshute is a civil parish immediately west and northwest of Marlborough in Wiltshire, England. Unusually for a Wiltshire parish, it does not take its name from any town or village. The population at the 2011 census was 193.

The River Kennet and the A4 road cross the parish; the boundary between Marlborough and Preshute is beyond Manton, about  along the A4 from the centre of Marlborough.

The parish is almost entirely downland and farmland. The settlements are Manton House (with Manton Stables, where racehorses are trained) and the hamlet of Clatford.

History
In the 12th or 13th century the boundary between Preshute and Marlborough was immediately west of Marlborough Castle and the parish included the villages of Manton and Clatford. In 1925 an eastern section, including Preshute church. was transferred to Marlborough and in 1934 the Marlborough boundary moved further west to include Manton.

Church
It has a 15th-century tower and was restored in 1854 by T.H. Wyatt; it is Grade II* listed and forms part of the Marlborough Benefice.

This area was identified as Preshute as recently as the 1961 (7th series) Ordnance Survey map but on current maps and road signs it is part of Manton.

School
Preshute Primary School is in Manton, outside the parish.

See also
Marlborough White Horse

References

External links
 

Civil parishes in Wiltshire